Sally O'Neil (born Virginia Louise Concepta Noonan; October 23, 1908 – June 18, 1968) was an American film actress of the 1920s. She appeared in more than 40 films, often with her name above the title.

Early years
O'Neil was one of eleven children born to Judge Thomas Francis Patrick Noonan and his wife, Hannah Kelly, a Metropolitan Opera singer, in Bayonne, New Jersey. One of her sisters was actress Suzanne Dobson Noonan, an actress known professionally as Molly O'Day. Another sister, Isabelle, also acted in films.

Films 

Convent-educated, she started her career in vaudeville, billed as Chotsie Noonan and known for her petite but curvaceous frame and curly brown hair. She was teamed with Constance Bennett and Joan Crawford in the MGM film Sally, Irene and Mary (1925), directed by Edmund Goulding, which was "her big break."

She was paired with Crawford again as a WAMPAS Baby Star in 1926. Her fame began to subside after sound films replaced silent pictures; she also had a problem with stage fright. 

Her pictures include The Brat, a 1931 pre-Code film directed by John Ford and screened at New York City's Museum of Modern Art in November 2016. A showcase for O'Neil, the movie involves a brash chorus girl's effect upon a snobbish family when their son brings her home in order to research a novel.

Stage
O'Neil appeared on Broadway in When We Are Married (1940).

Later years
By the late 1930s, her film career was over, but she continued on stage and toured with the USO until the 1950s.

Personal life
In October 1953, O'Neil married businessman S.S. Battles. They divorced in 1957, but they soon remarried.

Death
O'Neil died of pneumonia in Galesburg, Illinois, aged 59, on June 18, 1968.

Partial filmography

 Don't (1925)
 Sally, Irene and Mary (1925)
 Mike (1926)
 The Auction Block (1926)
 Battling Butler (1926)
 Slide, Kelly, Slide (1927)
 The Callahans and the Murphys (1927)
 Frisco Sally Levy (1927)
 Becky (1927)
 The Lovelorn (1927)
 The Battle of the Sexes (1928)
 Mad Hour (1928)
 Bachelor's Paradise (1928)
The Floating College  (1928)
 Girl on the Barge (1929)
 Broadway Scandals (1929)
 The Sophomore (1929)
 Jazz Heaven (1929)
 A Real Girl (1929)
 On with the Show (1929)
 The Show of Shows (1929)
 Broadway Fever (1929)
 Girl of the Port (1930)
 Hold Everything (1930)
 Kathleen Mavourneen (1930)
 Murder by the Clock (1931)
 Salvation Nell (1931)
 The Brat (1931)
 By Appointment Only (1933)
  The Moth (1934)
 Beggar's Holiday (1934)
 Convention Girl (1935)
 Too Tough to Kill (1935)
 Kathleen Mavourneen (1937)

References

External links

 
 
 Sally O'Neil at Virtual History
 http://www.fanpix.net/gallery/sally-o-neil-pictures.htm

1908 births
1968 deaths
Actresses from New Jersey
American silent film actresses
American film actresses
Deaths from pneumonia in Illinois
Actors from Bayonne, New Jersey
People from Galesburg, Illinois
Vaudeville performers
20th-century American actresses
WAMPAS Baby Stars